Abul-Fath Asad ibn Muhammad al-Mayhani was a Persian scholar, who was born in Mayhana. He was an immediate follower of Al-Ghazali.

Biography
According to Ibn al-Jawzi and Taj al-Din al-Subki, Asad Mayhani was a highly influential scholar of Islamic law. The works (al-Taliqa or the Notes) of Asad al-Mayhani were adopted by the Nizamiyya Madrassa in Baghdad. He studied Islamic Jurisprudence with Abu-Muzaffar al-Samani (who was the grandfather of the historian Abu Saad Al-Samani) at the Nizamiyya madrasa in Merw & then moved to Ghazna, where he became famous.

Abd al-Latif al-Baghdadi said that his father studied "The Notes" of Asad al-Mayhani, who was very famous at that time. 

Ibn al-Jawzi said that many Hanbalites studied "the Notes" of Asad al-Mayhani, even though he was a Shafi'i. 

In the thirteenth century, Ibn Kathir said Asad Mayhani's "Notes" were still popular. 

Asad al-Mayhani said about the works of al-Ghazali:

Death
Asad Mayhani died in 527/1132 in Hamadan.

See also 
 List of Ash'aris and Maturidis

References 

Shafi'is
Mujaddid
Hadith scholars
Sunni Muslim scholars of Islam
1068 births
1132 deaths
12th-century Muslim scholars of Islam
11th-century jurists
12th-century jurists
Biographical evaluation scholars